Edoardo or Eduardo Matania (1847 – 1929) was an Italian painter and illustrator, depicting detailed penciled portraits; and genre, patriotic and historic scenes.

History
He was born in Naples, and trained starting in 1862 at the Istituto di belle arti of Naples. He made a living mostly as an illustrator for the Bideri publishing house, and also worked with the editor Emilio Treves. He was attached to the School of Resina. For example, he illustrated a Storia del Risorgimento Italiano (1889) by Francesco Bertolini. Matania also illustrated an edition of Ariosto's La Gerusalemme liberata. He was one of the painters to decorate the ceilings of the Caffè Gambrinus of Naples.

Others in his immediate family also became well known illustrators. His son, Fortunino Matania also became a well-known painter and illustrator. Edoardo's nephew, Ugo Matania also became a well-known illustrator during World War I.

Gallery

References

Painters from Naples
19th-century Italian painters
Italian male painters
20th-century Italian painters
1847 births
1929 deaths
19th-century Italian male artists
20th-century Italian male artists